The 2023 Maine Black Bears football team will represent the University of Maine as a member of the Colonial Athletic Association (CAA) in the 2023 NCAA Division I FCS football season. The Black Bears are led by second-year head coach Jordan Stevens and play home games at Alfond Stadium in Orono, Maine.

Previous season

The Bears finished the 2022 season with an overall record of 2–9, 2–6 CAA play to finish in a tie for tenth place.

Schedule

References

Maine
Maine Black Bears football seasons
Maine Black Bears football